The striped hog-nosed skunk (Conepatus semistriatus) is a skunk species from Central and South America (from southern Mexico to northern Peru, and in the extreme east of Brazil).  This species of skunk is considered a generalist species, because they are able to thrive in, and withstand, disturbed environmental conditions. They can live in a wide range of habitats, including carrasco, arboreal caatinga, mango orchard, and dry forest scrub and occasionally, in rainforest.

Habitat
The striped hog-nosed skunk inhabits mainly the foothills, and partly timbered or brushy, sections of their general range. They usually avoid hot desert areas and heavy stands of timber. The largest populations occur in rocky, sparsely timbered areas.

Behaviour and diet
It is a nocturnal solitary animal, feeding mainly on invertebrates, small vertebrates and fruits. When temperature rises during the day, Conepatus semistriatus finds shelter in cool burrows and rests to maintain its body temperature and prevent water loss. Although C. semistriatus are predominantly nocturnal, studies show there is no significant correlation between brightness and activity.

Gallery

References

External links

Striped hog-nosed
Carnivorans of Central America
Carnivorans of South America
Mammals of Central America
Mammals of Mexico
Mammals of Colombia
Mammals of Venezuela
Mammals of Ecuador
Mammals of Peru
Mammals of Brazil
Mammals described in 1785
Least concern biota of North America
Least concern biota of South America